Juan de la Cámara (1525–1602) was a Spanish conquistador and an hidalgo. Born in Alcala de Henares, Spain,  he arrived in New Spain (present day Mexico) in 1539 and joined the Spanish Conquest of Yucatán, becoming one of the main collaborators of Francisco de Montejo. He had participated in the conquests of Mexico and Guatemala, and among the conquistadores he had the best and oldest documents of ancestral nobility.

In the beginnings of the General Captaincy of Yucatán, Don Juan de la Cámara occupied very important positions. One of the founders of the city of Mérida in Yucatán, for many years, he was alguacil of Mérida and in 1565, mayor of this city. The patriarch of the Yucatecan branch of the House of Cámara, many of his descendants held high political office during centuries of Spanish rule and, after independence, during the 19th and 20th centuries.

Military campaigns 
Juan de la Cámara took part in the conquest of "Las provincials de Grimel de Chetumal de los Zubeniques y de los Chaulacas" under direct orders of Captain Gaspar Pacheco. This was among the bloodiest phases in the conquest of Yucatán. Juan de la Cámara founded the City of Salamanca de Bacalar on the shores of the lagoon of Culo, near the city of Chetumal, Quintana Roo, Mexico.

Juan de la Cámara also participated in the conquest of Provincia del Golfo Dulce next to the Lake of Izabal, now part of Guatemala, under the orders of Captain  Francisco de Montejo and Captain Cristobal Maldonado. He also founded the city of Nueva Seville (Nueva Sevilla).

Under the orders of Captain Francisco Bracamonte, Juan de la Cámara participated in the general rise and rebellion of the Maya.

After the foundation of the city of Salamanca de Bacalar, the Spanish nobility awarded Juan de la Cámara the encomienda of the towns of Cahabon (today Guatemala) and Tituz. When he returned to Mérida after the rebellion of the Maya, the Spanish Crown awarded him the encomienda of the towns of Euan and Sinanche.

Patriarch of the House of Cámara 

Juan de la Cámara can trace his family tree beyond the thirteenth century, to the Spanish nobility of the Kingdom of Castille. His ancestors had fought for the Crown in many of the battles of the Iberian Reconquista. During the Siege of Málaga (1487), the Catholic Monarchs, Ferdinand II of Aragon and Isabella I of Castile, knighted Alfonso Ruiz de la Cámara, don Juan's great-grandfather, inducting him into the Order of the Golden Spur. In this act, the monarchs recognized the ancestral coat of arms of the House of Cámara. Juan de la Cámara was one of the few conquistadores that enjoyed the privilege of having the authenticated use of coat of arms in Castille.

Don Juan de la Cámara married in 1563 to Doña Francisca de Sandoval, daughter of the conquistador and hidalgo Don Gonzalo Méndez and doña Ana Sandoval. His descendants became one of the principal families of the old Mexican nobility during the viceregal period.

The case of the Cámara family constitutes an interesting genealogical case, unique, at least in the Yucatán, and hardly repeatable in the rest of Spanish America: it is a family that has prevailed from the first moments of the Colonial period to the present day, managing to retain its identity and continuity for more than eighteen generations, avoiding the loss of their original family name or their social status. From their sixteenth-century origins, the House of Cámara has managed to remain a single family with common genetic characteristics. Throughout the centuries, members of the House of Cámara commonly intermarried with other aristocratic families of European descent such as the Montejo, Solís, Ancona, Castillo, Patrón, Zavala, Vales and Peón families, as well as with people of their own House.

The descendants of Juan de la Cámara were, for many years, the owners of the Rancho de Cancún and its surroundings, currently one of the most important tourist destinations in the Caribbean. Through the nineteenth, twentieth and twenty-first centuries, the House of Cámara has contributed notable soldiers, politicians, men of the Church, professionals, landowners, businessmen and philanthropists.

See also 
 List of conquistadors

Further reading 
 Robert S. Chamberlain Conquest and Colonization of Yucatán 1517-1550, 1947, Washington DC.
 Jorge Rubio Mañé Alcaldes de Mérida Yucatán -Page 48, Mexico D.F. 1948.
 Francisco Jose Morales Roca Caballeros de la Espuela Dorada del Principado de Cataluña dinastia de TRASTAMARA 1412-1555.  Madrid 1988.
 Archivo General de Indias - México 971 - Page 330.
 Yucatán en el tiempo, enciclopedia alfabética. México, 1998. .

References

1525 births
1602 deaths
Spanish conquistadors
Castilian conquistadors
Spanish nobility
Mexican nobility
Mexican families
Mexican people of Spanish descent
People of New Spain
People from Alcalá de Henares